is a virtual reality first-person rail shooter video game developed and published in conjunction by Taito and Virtuality in 1994 for arcades, though the former is not credited in-game.

Gameplay 
Zone Hunter is a first-person shooter, and was one of the first VR arcade games.

Development and release 
Zone Hunter was developed at the same time as Sega's virtual reality Model 1 arcade game TecWar, which was also developed by Virtuality. Taito, who conceived the project and worked alongside Virtuality as a deal to bring the game into Japanese arcade markets under their banner. Due to low sales in the region, Taito terminated the deal between them and Virtuality, with the latter opening their offices in Japan afterwards.

A port for the Atari Jaguar was announced and planned to be released alongside the Jaguar VR headset peripheral at launch, with a demo created for demonstration purposes, but both the port and the peripheral were never released due to problems between Virtuality and Atari Corporation in their deal.

Reception 

Next Generation stated that "It's sad this game is neither as fun or playable as Doom, or as good looking as Virtua Cop, its closest kindred.  But we're keen on future titles looking and playing better, and we're sure companies like Virtuality are, too."

Notes

References

External links 
 
 Zone Hunter at GameFAQs
 Zone Hunter at MobyGames

1994 video games
Arcade video games
Arcade-only video games
Cancelled Atari Jaguar games
First-person shooters
Multiplayer and single-player video games
Rail shooters
Taito arcade games
Video games developed in the United Kingdom
Video games set in the 21st century
Virtual reality games
Virtuality games